This is a list of notable people from Northumberland County, New Brunswick. Although not everyone in this list was born in Northumberland County, they all live or have lived in Northumberland County and have had significant connections to the communities.

This article does not include People from Miramichi as they have their own section.

See also
List of people from New Brunswick

References

Northumberland